Jeppesen Gymnasium, also known as Jeppesen Fieldhouse, was a multi-purpose sports facility on the campus of the University of Houston in Houston, Texas.  The facility was the first home to the Houston Cougars men's basketball team, and later home to the Cougars women's volleyball team.  Located next to Robertson Stadium, the facility was demolished in 1996 to make room for renovations of Robertson Stadium such as the scoreboard.

Planning and construction
Prior to the construction of Robertson Stadium, the University of Houston campus had been built nearby in 1939. In the summer of 1941, construction began on Jeppesen Gymnasium as part of a joint project between the Works Progress Administration and the Houston Independent School District. It was constructed simultaneously with nearby Robertson Stadium.

Architecture and features
Designed by Harry D. Payne using an art deco design style, Jeppesen Gymnasium's structure consisted of two stories and a basement. It was built of reinforced concrete and steel with masonry walls.  Buttresses, columns, and steel trusses supported a sound-absorbing roof.  On the south end of the structure were four entrances to a lobby that led to the basketball court itself.

References

Sports venues demolished in 1996
Defunct college basketball venues in the United States
Houston Cougars basketball venues
Demolished sports venues in Texas
Basketball venues in Houston
Demolished buildings and structures in Houston
Defunct indoor arenas in Texas
1942 establishments in Texas
Sports venues completed in 1942
1996 disestablishments in Texas